"World Weary" is a popular song written by Noël Coward, for his 1928 musical, This Year of Grace, where it was introduced by Beatrice Lillie.

References 

Songs written by Noël Coward
1928 songs